Ibrahim Metwalli (born 20 October 1936) is an Egyptian rower. He competed in the men's eight event at the 1964 Summer Olympics.

References

1936 births
Living people
Egyptian male rowers
Olympic rowers of Egypt
Rowers at the 1964 Summer Olympics
Place of birth missing (living people)